Howard J. Worman (born May 21, 1959) is an American physician and cell biologist. He is Professor of Medicine and Pathology and Cell Biology at Columbia University and Attending Physician at NewYork-Presbyterian Hospital.

Education

Worman majored in chemistry and biology at Cornell University, from where he received a B.A. degree in 1981. He received a M.D. degree from the University of Chicago Pritzker School of Medicine in 1985. Worman trained in internal medicine at New York Hospital and then did postdoctoral research in cell biology in the laboratory of Günter Blobel at Rockefeller University. He obtained additional postdoctoral clinical training in liver disease with Fenton Schaffner at Mount Sinai Hospital in New York.

Career

Worman's first faculty position was as assistant professor of Medicine and Molecular Biology at the Mount Sinai School of Medicine in 1990. He was recruited to Columbia University in 1995, where he is currently Professor of Medicine and Pathology and Cell Biology. His research is primarily focused on inner nuclear membrane proteins, the nuclear lamina, the group of diseases known as laminopathies and liver diseases including primary biliary cholangitis and non-alcoholic fatty liver disease.

Publications

Worman has over 200 publications in cell biology and medicine. He has also authored trade books on liver diseases, including The Liver Disorders and Hepatitis Sourcebook.

Worman additionally is a periodic contributor to the satirical virtual publication "MISH Magazine" which is now thriving after 50 years since first being conceived in 1971.

Personal life 

Worman is married to Terry Chun; they have two children Maxwell Worman and Naomi Worman.

Honors and awards

Phi Beta Kappa
American Society for Clinical Investigation
Association of American Physicians

References

1959 births
Columbia University faculty
American physicians
Cornell University alumni
University of Chicago alumni
Icahn School of Medicine at Mount Sinai faculty
Living people